The 2013 Canadian Direct Insurance BC Men's Curling Championship was held from February 6 to 10 at the Parksville Curling Club in Parksville, British Columbia. The winner of the BC Men's Curling Championship will represent British Columbia at the 2013 Tim Hortons Brier in Edmonton.

Qualification process

Sixteen teams will qualify for the provincial tournament through several methods. The qualification process is as follows:

Teams
The teams are listed as follows:

Knockout Draw Brackets
The draw is listed as follows:

A event

B event

C event

Knockout results

Draw 1
Wednesday, February 6, 9:00 am

Draw 2
Wednesday, February 6, 2:00 pm

Draw 3
Wednesday, February 6, 7:30 pm

Draw 4
Thursday, February 7, 9:00 am

Draw 5
Thursday, February 7, 2:00 pm

Draw 6
Thursday, February 7, 7:00 pm

Draw 7
Friday, February 8, 9:00 am

Draw 8
Friday, February 8, 2:00 pm

Draw 9
Friday, February 8, 7:00 pm

Playoffs

1 vs. 2
Saturday, February 9, 11:00 am

3 vs. 4
Saturday, February 9, 11:00 am

Semifinal
Saturday, February 9, 7:30 pm

Final
Sunday, February 10, 5:00 pm

References

External links

Results from playdowns.com

Canadian Direct Insurance BC Men's Curling Championship
Curling in British Columbia
Parksville, British Columbia